ARD-Hauptstadtstudio (ARD Capital Studio) is a television studio in Berlin operated jointly by the members of the federal broadcasting network ARD. Located at Wilhelmstrasse in the Mitte area close to the centre of Germany's federal government, it is used by ARD members and outlets for broadcasts from the capital. Some programmes, for example the weekly political TV show Bericht aus Berlin, are broadcast from the studio.

The studios were opened on 16 April 1999, when the federal government moved from Bonn to Berlin.

References 

Television studios
Buildings and structures in Mitte
Hauptstadtstudio
Office buildings completed in 1999
1999 establishments in Germany
Mass media in Berlin